The 1994 Rolex 24 at Daytona was a 24-hour endurance sports car race held on February 5–6, 1994 at the Daytona International Speedway road course. The race served as the opening round of the 1994 IMSA GT Championship.

Victory overall and in the GTS class went to the No. 76 Cunningham Racing Nissan 300ZX Turbo driven by Scott Pruett, Butch Leitzinger, Paul Gentilozzi, and Steve Millen. Victory in the WSC class went to the No. 2 Brix Racing Spice AK93 driven by Jeremy Dale, Ruggero Melgrati, Bob Schader, and Price Cobb. Victory in the GTU class went to the No. 65 Heico Motorsports Porsche 964 Carrera RSR driven by Ulli Richter, Karl-Heinz Wlazik, Dirk Ebeling, and Gunter Döbler.

Race results
Class winners in bold.

References

24 Hours of Daytona
1994 in sports in Florida
1994 in American motorsport
24 Hours of Daytona